The 2010 WGC-CA Championship was a golf tournament held March 11–14 at Doral Golf Resort & Spa in Doral, Florida, a suburb west of Miami. It was the eleventh WGC-CA Championship tournament, and the second of four World Golf Championships events staged in 2010.

The only players eligible to compete who did not enter were six-time champion Tiger Woods (on an indefinite break from golf) and Ryo Ishikawa (graduating from high school).

Ernie Els, the 2004 champion, won his second WGC title with a bogey-free 66 (−6) in the final round, four strokes ahead of runner-up Charl Schwartzel, the 54-hole co-leader with Els.

Field
The field consisted of players from the top of the Official World Golf Ranking and the money lists/Order of Merit from the six main professional golf tours. 68 of the 70 qualifying players competed. Each player is classified according to the first category in which he qualified, but other categories are shown in parentheses.

1. The top 50 players from the Official World Golf Ranking, as of March 1, 2010
Robert Allenby (2), Ángel Cabrera (2,3), Paul Casey (2,5,6), Stewart Cink (2,3), Tim Clark (2), Luke Donald (2,3), Ernie Els (2,3,5), Ross Fisher (2,5), Jim Furyk (2,3), Sergio García (2,5,6), Lucas Glover (2,3), Retief Goosen (2,3), Anders Hansen (2,9), Søren Hansen (2), Pádraig Harrington (2,3,5), Yuta Ikeda (2,7), Thongchai Jaidee (2,5,6,10), Miguel Ángel Jiménez (2,6), Dustin Johnson (2,3,4), Zach Johnson (2,3), Robert Karlsson (2,6), Martin Kaymer (2,5,6), Anthony Kim (2), Søren Kjeldsen (2,5), Matt Kuchar (2), Hunter Mahan (2,3,4), Graeme McDowell (2), Rory McIlroy (2,5), Phil Mickelson (2,3), Edoardo Molinari (2), Francesco Molinari (2,5), Sean O'Hair (2,3), Geoff Ogilvy (2,3,4,5), Kenny Perry (2,3), Ian Poulter (2,4,5,6), Álvaro Quirós (2,5), Charl Schwartzel (2,6,9), Adam Scott (2), Michael Sim (2,8), Vijay Singh (2), Henrik Stenson (2,5), Steve Stricker (2,3,4), Camilo Villegas (2,4,6), Nick Watney (2,3), Mike Weir (2,3), Lee Westwood (2,5,6), Oliver Wilson (2,5), Yang Yong-eun (2,3)

Ryo Ishikawa (2,7) and Tiger Woods (2,3) did not play.

2. The top 50 players from the Official World Golf Ranking, as of March 8, 2010

3. The top 30 players from the final 2009 FedExCup Points List
Jason Dufner, Brian Gay, Jerry Kelly, Marc Leishman, Steve Marino, Kevin Na, John Senden, Heath Slocum, David Toms, Scott Verplank

4. The top 10 players from the 2010 FedExCup Points List, as of March 8, 2010
Ben Crane, Bill Haas, J. B. Holmes, Ryan Palmer

5. The top 20 players from the final 2009 European Tour Order of Merit
Simon Dyson, Gonzalo Fernández-Castaño, Peter Hanson, Ross McGowan

6. The top 10 players from the European Tour Order of Merit, as of March 1, 2010

7. The top 2 players from the final 2009 Japan Golf Tour Order of Merit

8. The top 2 players from the final 2009 PGA Tour of Australasia Order of Merit
Alistair Presnell

9. The top 2 players from the final 2009 Sunshine Tour Order of Merit

10. The top 2 players from the final 2009 Asian Tour Order of Merit
Liang Wenchong

Past champions in the field 

 Six-time champion Tiger Woods was on an indefinite leave from the tour and did not enter.

Round summaries

First round
Thursday, March 11, 2010

Second round
Friday, March 12, 2010

Third round
Saturday, March 13, 2010

Final round
Sunday, March 14, 2010

Scorecard
Final round

Cumulative tournament scores, relative to par

Source:

References

External links
ESPN: Leaderboard
Coverage on the European Tour's official site

WGC Championship
Golf in Florida
WGC-CA Championship
WGC-CA Championship
WGC-CA Championship